Reyhanlı bombings may refer to one of the following:

 2013 Reyhanlı car bombings
 2019 Reyhanlı car bombing